Peddarikam is a 1992 Indian Telugu-language drama film, produced and directed by A. M. Rathnam under the Sri Surya Movies banner. It is a remake of the Malayalam film Godfather. The film stars Jagapathi Babu, Sukanya, N. N. Pillai (reprising his role from Godfather), and Bhanumathi with music composed by Raj–Koti. This is Sukanya's first Telugu film as a heroine. The film was a Super Hit at the box-office.

Plot
The film begins in a village where fierce rivalry upholds between the families of Parvataneni Parasuramayya and Adusumilli Basavapurnamma the arbitrators. Parasuramayya detests women and prohibits their entry into his house. Hence, his 4 sons Balaramaiah, Rama Krishna, Narasimham, and Krishna Mohan are left unmarried. Destiny makes Krishna Mohan and Janaki, granddaughter of Basavapurnamma collegians at law college. Meanwhile, Basavapurnamma sets Janaki’s match with the Home Minister which has been withdrawn owing to the influence of Parasuramayya. Moreover, Krishna Mohan and his bestie Prasad heckle and humiliate Janaki in college. Thereby, enraged Basavapurnamma exploits Janaki as a weapon to beguile Krishna Mohan, accordingly creating a rift in Parasuramayya's family.

Thus, Janaki starts her play when Prasad ideates Krishna Mohan to counterfeit her as an avenge. Soon, unintentionally, the feign turns into true love. Knowing it, Veerabhadram the younger son of Basavapurnamma an amicable spins back. Indeed, Janaki’s mother should wedlock Balaramaiah when Basavapurnamma abducted the bride and united with her elder son Sambasivudu. Following this, Parasuramayya’s wife is killed in that havoc when incensed Parasuramayya slaughtered Basavapurnamma’s husband. Listening to it, the love birds backsteps. Afterward, through Prasad Krishna Mohan learns that Rama Krishna is maintaining secret family life. Whereby, he assures him to all help in doing so to nuptial Janaki. Being cognizant of it, Parasuramayya assaults Rama Krishna when Krishna Mohan obstructs his way. As a result, he ostracizes them from the family.

On the other side, Basavapurnamma is shocked to know that Janaki's love is not a mere act. So, she immediately sets out her alliance with their family Lawyer's son. Besides, she is still ruses for the complete elimination of Parasuramayya’s clan. In that gameplay, she sends her sons for Parasuramayya's support in preventing Krishna Mohan's wedding with Janaki which he approves. Then, she attests her aid to Krishna Mohan. Here, Veerabhadram reveals her plan to Krishna Mohan. With his help, he sneaks into the marriage hall and is almost on the verge to knit Janaki when Basavapurnamma curses Parasuramayya. Therein, her foil play is exposed. At that juncture, Krishna Mohan declares the reason behind his arrival is not to couple up with Janaki, but to protect his father's prestige. A regretful Parasuramayya allows Krishna Mohan to tie the knot with Janaki and welcomes them by paving the way for the women into his house.

Cast
 Jagapati Babu as Krishna Mohan
 Sukanya as Janaki
 N. N. Pillai as Parvathaneni Parasuramayya
 Bhanumathi Ramakrishna as Adusumilli Basavapurnamma
 Chandra mohan as Ramakrishna 
 Vijayakumar as Balaramudu
 M.Balayya as Samba Sivudu
 Allu Ramalingaiah as Lawyer
 Sudhakar as Prasad
 Paruchuri Venkateswara Rao as Lawyer
 Narra Venkateswara Rao as Mallikarjunudu
 Chalapathi Rao as Chandra Shekarudu
 Rami Reddy as Narasimham
 Uday Prakash as Veerabhadram
 Kavitha as Lalitha
 Tatineni Rajeswari as Mallikarjunudu's wife
 Anitha as Warden
 Sadhana as Chandra Shekarudu's wife

Soundtrack

Music composed by Raj–Koti. Music released on Lahari Music Company.

Awards
Sudhakar won Nandi Award for Best Male Comedian for his excellent comic role in this film.

References

External links
 

1992 films
1990s Telugu-language films
Telugu remakes of Malayalam films
Indian romantic drama films
Films scored by Raj–Koti
1992 romantic drama films